János Kollár (born 7 June 1956) is a Hungarian mathematician, specializing in algebraic geometry.

Professional career
Kollár began his studies at the Eötvös University in Budapest and later received his PhD at Brandeis University in 1984 under the direction of Teruhisa Matsusaka with a thesis on canonical threefolds. He was Junior Fellow at Harvard University from 1984 to 1987 and professor at the University of Utah from 1987 until 1999. Currently, he is professor at Princeton University.

Contributions
Kollár is known for his contributions to the minimal model program for threefolds and hence the compactification of moduli of algebraic surfaces, for pioneering the notion of rational connectedness (i.e. extending the theory of rationally connected varieties for varieties over the complex field to varieties over local fields), and finding counterexamples to a conjecture of John Nash. (In 1952 Nash conjectured a converse to a famous theorem he proved, and Kollár was able to provide many 3-dimensional counterexamples from an important new structure theory for a class of 3-dimensional algebraic varieties.) 

Kollár also gave the first algebraic proof of effective Nullstellensatz: let  be polynomials of degree at most  in  variables; if they have no common zero, then the equation  has a solution such that each polynomial  has degree at most .

Awards and honors
Kollár is a member of the National Academy of Sciences since 2005 and received the Cole Prize in 2006. He is an external member of the Hungarian Academy of Sciences since 1995. In 2012 he became a fellow of the American Mathematical Society. In 2016 he became a fellow of the American Academy of Arts and Sciences. In 2017 he received the Shaw Prize in Mathematical Sciences.

In 1990 he was an invited speaker at the International Congress of Mathematicians (ICM) in Kyōto. In 1996 he gave one of the plenary addresses at the European Mathematical Congress in Budapest (Low degree polynomial equations: arithmetic, geometry and topology). He was also selected as a plenary speaker at the ICM held in 2014 in Seoul.

As a high school student, Kollár represented Hungary and won Gold medals at both the 1973 and 1974 International Mathematical Olympiads.

Works
 
 
  (Japanese by Iwanami Shoten).

References

External links

Homepage in Princeton

1956 births
Living people
Algebraic geometers
20th-century American mathematicians
20th-century Hungarian mathematicians
21st-century American mathematicians
21st-century Hungarian mathematicians
Institute for Advanced Study visiting scholars
Harvard Fellows
University of Utah faculty
Princeton University faculty
Brandeis University alumni
Eötvös Loránd University alumni
Members of the Hungarian Academy of Sciences
Members of the United States National Academy of Sciences
Fellows of the American Mathematical Society
International Mathematical Olympiad participants
Fellows of the American Academy of Arts and Sciences